The military ranks of Mexico are the military insignia used by the Mexican Armed Forces. Mexico shares a rank structure similar to that of Spain.

Ranks

Commissioned officer ranks
The rank insignia of commissioned officers.

Other ranks
The rank insignia of non-commissioned officers and enlisted personnel.

Branch colors
Rank badges have a band of colour indicating branch:

References

External links
 
 
 
 
 

Mexico
 
Military of Mexico